Comic Book Whore is the debut solo album by American singer Jane Jensen. It was released in 1996 through Flip Records, and was re-released through Interscope Records on October 1, 1996.

Track listing

References 

1996 debut albums